Hailemariyam Amare Tegegn (born 22 February 1997) is an Ethiopian runner specialising in the 3000 metres steeplechase. Hailemariyam placed 5th in the 2014 World Junior Championships. He represented his country at the 2015 World Championships in Beijing finishing twelfth in the final. He won a bronze medal at the 2015 African Games.  He participated at the 2016 Summer Olympics but failed to reach the final. In 2022, he set a personal best time of 8:06.29 to finish 3rd at the Meeting International Mohammed VI d'Athletisme de Rabat. Later that year, he won the 3000 metres steeplechase and 5000 metres at the African Championships. He competed at the 2022 World Athletics Championships, reaching the 3000m steeplechase final and placing 10th. He was 8th at the 2022 Diamond League Final in Zurich.

Competition record

References

External links

1997 births
Living people
Place of birth missing (living people)
Ethiopian male long-distance runners
Ethiopian male steeplechase runners
World Athletics Championships athletes for Ethiopia
Athletes (track and field) at the 2016 Summer Olympics
Olympic athletes of Ethiopia
African Games bronze medalists for Ethiopia
African Games medalists in athletics (track and field)
Athletes (track and field) at the 2015 African Games
African Championships in Athletics winners
20th-century Ethiopian people
21st-century Ethiopian people